Nedoharky is a village in Poltava Oblast (province) of central Ukraine. Nedoharky means “not burnt out”.

References

Kremenchugsky Uyezd

Villages in Kremenchuk Raion